Myazedi inscription (also Yazakumar Inscription or the Gubyaukgyi Inscription), inscribed in 1113, is the oldest surviving stone inscription of the Burmese language. "Myazedi" means "emerald stupa" ("zedi" being akin to the Pali "cetiya" and Thai "chedi"), and the name of the inscription comes from a pagoda located nearby. The inscriptions were made in four languages: Burmese, Pyu, Mon, and Pali, which all tell the story of Prince Yazakumar and King Kyansittha. The primary importance of the Myazedi inscription is that the inscriptions allowed for the deciphering of the written Pyu language.

There are two main inscriptions in Burma today. One exists on the platform of the Myazedi Pagoda, in the village of Myinkaba (south of Bagan), in Mandalay Division. The other was discovered by German Pali scholar Dr. Emanuel Forchhammer in 1886–1887 and is currently in display at the Bagan Archaeological Museum. The Myazedi inscription is recognised as Memory of the World Register by UNESCO.

Translation and Analysis 
The inscription has 39 lines in Burmese language, 41 lines in Pali, 33 lines in Mon Language and 26 lines in Pyu language. It can be generally divided into three categories, donation, wish and curse. The nearest translation is as follows:

Analysis 
The typical Bagan handwriting was either rectangular or circular in shape, but in this inscription, the handwriting reassembles Tamarind seeds.

Yazakumar referred to his father as Śrī Tribhuvanāditya Dhammarāja,meaning "The king who can enlighten all three worlds like the sun",his mother as Trilokavaṭansakā devi (The queen who could lead all three worlds) and the Pagan Empire as Arimaddanāpura Empire (Meaning: The place where they can successfully outnumber enemies) respectively.

The purpose of the donation category is to let people appreciate their deeds. The wishing category is part of the tradition of Buddhism. The main intention of writing curse to preserve the donations and to prevent donated structures from being damaged.

From this inscription, the reign periods of Kyansittha, Anawrahta, Saw Lu,and Alaungsithu can be calculated, old Pyu Language can be learnt, and Yazakumar's respect and love for his father can be observed.

In Pali 
In Pali language, the inscription reads:

Śrī. Buddhādikam vatthuvaram namitvā pāññam katam yam jinasā
sanasmim anārikam Rājakumāra nāmadheyyena vakkhā
mi sunātha metam. Nibbanā lokanāthassa aṭhavī
sādike gate sahasse pana vassānam chasate vā pare ta
-thā. Arimaddananāmasmim pure āsi mahabbalo rājā
Tibhuvanādicco udicca diccavamsajo. Tassā te
kā piyā devi sā Tilokavaṭamsikā hi
tesi kusalā sabbekiccesu pana rājino. Ta
ssā seko suto Rājakumaro nāma nāmat-
-o amacco rājakiccesu byavato satimā
vidu. Adā gāmattayam tassā deviyā soma
hipati pasanno sabbadā dāsa pribhogena buññjitum.
Aniccatā vasam tassā gatāya pana deviyā rā-
-jā Rājakumārassa adā gāmattayam puna. Aṭhavīsa
-ti vassāni rajjam dhammena kātriya māranantika rogassa-
vassam patte narādipe. Saranto dhammarājassa mahantam gu-
ṇa saññcayam kāretvā satthuno bimbam sabbasovaṇṇa-
yam subham. Gahetvā tam mahatena sakkārena sumānaso
upasaṅkamma rājanam āha cintitamattano. Bhavamkatvā
nidam satthubimbam sovaṇṇyam subham akāsim vo va-
-ram puññam sāmi tumhe nūmodatha. Gāmattayam pivo
sāmi pubbe dinnantu me again imasseva munidassa demi ta
ññcā nūmodatha. Evam vutte mahipālo roge
nāturamānaso sadhu, sadhūti vatvāna tuṭhahattho
pamodito. Dayā payo mahātheyo theyo muggali
puttako sumedhatta sumedhoti laddhanāmo ca paṇṭito
brahmapālo tathā brhamadevo sampanna silavā so no
bahussuto samghasena vho varapaṇṭito. Etesam pa-
na bikkhūnam sammukhā so sumānaso jalam pātesi katavana sa-
kkhintu vasudhātalam. Tato so tan mahāmacco bibam so va-
-ṇṇayam subham patiṭhāpiya kāresi guham kaññcanathūpikam.
Katvāna maṅgalam Buddhapatimāya guhāyaca akāsevam paṇī
dhānam nibbinno bhavasaṅkate. Karonetana mayā etam yam pu-
-ññam tam samācitam hotu sabbaññuta ññaṇa pative dhā-
-yā paccayo. Yattakā ta maya dāsā gamattayaniva-
-sino dinnā guhāya sovaṇṇapatimāya mahesi
no. Putto me va paputto va añño va panañña
tako yo koci pāpa samkappo naro assaddha
mānāso. Kareyyupadduvam tesam dāsānam si naramamo
Metteya dipadindassa dassanam nāthigacchatū
ti.

Gallery

References

 Nishida Tatsuo 西田龍雄 (1955) "Myazedki 碑文における中古ビルマ語の研究　Myazedi hibu ni okeru chūko biruma go no kenkyū. Studies in the later ancient Burmese Language through Myazedi Inscriptions."　古代學 Kodaigaku Palaeologia 4.1:17-31 and 5.1: 22-40.
 Yabu Shirō 藪 司郎 (2006). 古ビルマ語資料におけるミャゼディ碑文<1112年>の古ビルマ語 / Kobirumago shiryō ni okeru myazedi hibun senhyakujūninen no kobirumago ōbī / Old Burmese (OB) of Myazedi inscription in OB materials. Osaka: Osaka University of Foreign Studies.

Link to pictures
Myazedi Inscription at AncientBagan.com 

Myazedi Inscription A at Zenodo 

Myazedi Inscription B at Zenodo 

History of Myanmar
Burmese culture
Earliest known manuscripts by language
Multilingual texts
Bagan
Inscriptions of Myanmar
Memory of the World Register
1113 works
Burmese Buddhist texts
Buddhist inscriptions
12th-century inscriptions